William Gordon Hunter, or Bill Hunter, was a statistician at the University of Wisconsin–Madison. He was co-author of the classic book Statistics for Experimenters, and co-founder of the Center for Quality and Productivity Improvement with George E. P. Box.

Hunter was born March 27, 1937 in Buffalo, New York. In 1959 he received a bachelor's degree from Princeton and in 1960 a master's from the University of Illinois in chemical engineering. He then became the first doctoral student at the new department of statistics at the University of Wisconsin–Madison founded by George Box.

He contributed to the book Statistics for Experimenters by Box, William Hunter, and Stuart Hunter (no relation to William Hunter). He founded the Statistics Division of the American Society for Quality and the Center for Quality and Productivity Improvement in Madison, Wisconsin. The Statistics Division of the American Society for Quality gives an annual award called the William G. Hunter Award.

According to Box, "[Hunter] wanted to make a difference in the lives of less fortunate people, and he and his family spent extended periods of time helping third world countries."  Hunter taught in Singapore for a year and half and Nigeria for a year, both in the 1970s. In the early 1980s, before China allowed in many foreign experts, he spent a summer lecturing there.  He helped build Singapore's quality movement.

Hunter was a leader in the effort to adopt the Deming system of Profound Knowledge and related ideas in the public sector. He contributed to Deming's Out of the Crisis, relating how the city of Madison applied Deming's ideas to a public sector organization.

He was a fellow of the American Statistical Association, the American Association for the Advancement of Science, and the American Society for Quality Control. From 1963 to 1983 he was an associate editor of Technometrics. He was the chairman of the Section on Physical and Engineering Sciences of the American Statistical Association and also served on that organization's board of directors. He served on boards for the National Research Council of the National Academy of Sciences and the National Academy of Engineering.

Hunter died of cancer on December 29, 1986 at the age of 49.

References

External links
Web site by his son
Assessment of his life by George Box
Statistics for Experimenters
Obituary (starting on page 5)
Hunter Award presented by the Statistics Division of the American Society for Quality

1937 births
1986 deaths
Scientists from Buffalo, New York
University of Wisconsin–Madison faculty
Princeton University alumni
University of Illinois alumni
University of Wisconsin–Madison College of Letters and Science alumni
American statisticians
Mathematicians from New York (state)